Miyin Temple is a Buddhist temple located in Weishan Township, Ningxiang, Hunan, China.

History

Tang dynasty
In 813, in the eighth year of the age of Yuanhe of Emperor Xianzong, the traveler who named Liu Qian came to Ningxiang, Hunan Province. He saw the Wei Mountain's steep cliffs, lofty peaks, roaring waterfalls, gurgling springs, towering trees and fragrant flowers, and Wei Mountain has seven hills like the Big Dipper. After the tour, Liu Qian came to Baizhang Mountain in Jiangxi and told his friend Baizhang Huaihai about the natural landscape he had seen. He told Huaihai that there would be a good place to build temples. Huaihai followed Liuqian's advice, he commanded his disciple Weishan Lingyou to go there, build temples and advertise Folk Buddhism. On August 15 in the Chinese lunar calendar, Lingyou came to Wei Mountain. He built a hut to live in. In 807, in the second year of the age of Yuanhe of Emperor Xianzong, Da'an and Lingyou built Yingchan Temple. They then renamed it Santa Temple.

In 845, after the Great Anti-Buddhist Persecution, Lingyou disbanded the monastery, and lived a self-cultivation for food life. At that time, the prime minister Pei Xiu had retreated and worked in Hunan for Jingzhou Provincial Governor. He was Lingyou's friend. He sent Lingyou a copy of the Chinese Buddhist canon.

In 849, Emperor Xuanzong renamed the temple Miyin Temple. At that time, the prime minister Pei Xiu built Miyin Temple, and his second son Pei Wende replaced the crown prince as a monk. Lingyou gave him a Buddhist name Fahai. He was a monk in the most famous Chinese tale the Legend of the White Snake.

When Lingyou came to Yang Mountain, Yichun, Jiangxi, he found a new form of  Buddhism: Guiyang school.

Song dynasty

In 1104, in the third year of the age of Chongning of Emperor Huizong, Miyin Temple was destroyed by fire. Monk Kongyin rebuilt it.

Ming dynasty
In 1370, in the third year of the age of Hongwu of Hongwu Emperor, Miyin Temple was destroyed by fire, Chedang rebuilt the Multi-Buddha Hall.

In 1619, in the forty-seventh year of the age of Wanli of Wanli Emperor, Miyin Temple was destroyed by fire.

Qing dynasty
In 1655, in the twelfth year of the age of Shunzhi of Shunzhi Emperor, Huishan Chaohai rebuilt Miyin Temple and changed the religious format to the Rinzai school.

Republic of China

In 1918, Miyin Temple was destroyed by fire, the arsonist was Zhang Sanyuan.

In 1922, monk Yongguang recovered the Guiyang school of Buddhism at this temple. He invited some Eminent monks to advertise Folk Buddhism.

In 1933, a monk named Bao raised donations and rebuilt Miyin Temple.

People's Republic of China
In 1966, during the Cultural Revolution, Miyin Temple was knocked down by the Red Guards.

In 1972, Miyin Temple was listed as a provincial culture and relics site.

In September 2005, Hunan Buddhist Association, the People's Government of Ningxiang and Miyin Temple hosted "The International Buddhist Culture Festival".

References

Bibliography

External links

Buddhist temples in Changsha
Buildings and structures in Ningxiang
Tourist attractions in Changsha
9th-century establishments in China
9th-century Buddhist temples
Religious buildings and structures completed in 807